Pat Collier Frank (born November 21, 1929) is an American politician in the state of Florida.

Frank was born in Ohio and came to Florida in 1935. She attended the University of Florida and Georgetown University School of Law. A business economist, she served in the Florida State Senate from 1979 to 1988, as a member of the Democratic Party (23rd district). She also served in the Florida House of Representatives from 1976 to 1978.  She was elected to her fourth term as Clerk of the Court in Hillsborough County, Florida, (Tampa), where she has resided since 1961.

She was among the first class of women admitted to Georgetown University School of Law, where she met her husband, the late Judge Richard Harlan Frank, Second District Court of Appeals, (Florida).  Judge Frank and Pat Collier met while in law school in a contracts class, where they later decided, "to make one of their own", (as Pat Frank phrased it).  They were married 93 days after meeting in that Contracts class, on December 22, 1951, at the Washington National Cathedral, in Washington, D.C.

References

External links

1929 births
Living people
Politicians from Cleveland
Georgetown University Law Center alumni
University of Florida alumni
Women state legislators in Florida
Democratic Party Florida state senators
Democratic Party members of the Florida House of Representatives
Economists from Ohio
21st-century American women